The Muggs are an American band from Detroit, Michigan. Formed in 2000 by guitarist Danny Methric, bassist Tony DeNardo <https://musicwikidetroit.org/index.php/Muggs>.

History

Early Years (2000-2004) 
Danny Methric and Tony DeNardo got together and decided to form a more bluesy band than their previous bands had been. They found drummer Matt Rost who agreed to join the band. In October 2000, the band recorded their first EP demo to play to help get gigs. In March 2001, they were invited to play the Hamtramck Blowout, a music festival that involves hundreds of Detroit bands at nearly twenty different bars in Hamtramk City in Detroit, and continued playing more shows until September. In August 2001 they played the last Gold Dollar show ever and Cadieux Café's "Mussel Beach Music Festival." September 2 was their last show before Tony suffered from a hemorrhagic stroke that nearly ended his life. He was completely paralyzed on his right side and unable to speak. DeNardo survived his stroke but was in bad shape.

The other members decided to not replace him. Instead, they became involved with several other groups until Tony recovered. These bands and projects included Over Under Sideways Down, the Kingsnakes, The Go, and the Paybacks.
After three fundraisers for DeNardo, he was able to go to Southern California for some medical treatment that he hoped would speed his recovery. Tony decided to try his bass lines on a Rhodes keyboard bass after a suggestion from the Muggs' old friend Matt Smith, from the band Outrageous Cherry. They returned to rock together after DeNardo had rehabbed for 2 long years, and then were signed with metro Detroit indie label, Times Beach Records, in the spring of 2004.

The Muggs (2005-2007) 
They released their self-titled album on July 19, 2005, after having their songs on the documentary rockumentary. During a tour in Spain they were voted the Best Blues Artist/Group for 2007 in the Feb 28th, 2007 issue of Real Detroit Weekly. 
In August 2007, the band was selected to audition for the Fox TV show, The Next Great American Band and made it to the Top 12 out of 10,000+ applicants. The band appeared on The Next Great American Band for four episodes and got to play two originals for the entire nation to see: "Should've Learned My Lesson" from their first CD, and "Slow Curve" from their not then yet released yet second full length album, On With The Show.

In February 2008, they won "Best Rock Band of 2007" and, at the 2008 Detroit Music Awards, won "Outstanding Rock Artist/Group" award. Danny Methric won the "Outstanding Rock/Pop Instrumentalist" award as a guitarist.

On With the Show (2008-2009) 
On May 9, 2008, the band released On With the Show, their second CD. The album received an 8/10 article from Classic Rock Magazine. The band then opened for a variety of rock bands including Mountain, Robin Trower, Cactus, Savoy Brown, Ten Years After, Glenn Hughes of Deep Purple/Black Sabbath, Johnny Lang, Candlebox, North Mississippi Allstars, the Verve Pipe, Electric Six, and the Detroit Cobras. In October 2009, Matt Rost stepped down as drummer of The Muggs.  Todd Glass, one of the most sought after drummers in Detroit replaced Rost.

Born Ugly/ Full Tilt (2010-present) 
In late 2010, the band, now with Glass on drums, entered the studio to begin recording their third CD, entitled Born Ugly. The official release date was April 29, 2011. The band also recorded a live show at Cadieux Cafe in Detroit, MI. in late October 2012 which they released on April 26, 2013 entitled Full Tilt: Live At Cadieux Cafe At the 2013 Detroit Music Awards, the Muggs won once again for 'Outstanding Rock Artist/Group' & 'Outstanding Rock/Pop Instrumentalist' for the Fender Rhodes bassist, Tonymuggs. They now have 4 tours of Europe under their belts as well as being on a host of internet stations including Pandora and Spotify. They are also on all AMI/Rowe internet jukeboxes across the U.S.

Discography 
The Muggs (July 19, 2005)
On With the Show (May 9, 2008)
Bite Of The Weredog Single (October 25, 2008)Born Ugly (April 29, 2011)Full Tilt: Live at Cadieux Cafe 2 CD (April 26, 2013)Straight up Boogaloo'' (March 16, 2015)
’’Slave to Sound - Volume 5’’ (January 3, 2020)

List Of Awards
2020
-Release of their 6th full length LP, (5th studio LP), Slave To Sound (1/3)
-Detroit Music Awards for “Outstanding Rock Recording – Eye To Eye (Slave To Sound LP)” (4/19)

2018
-Este Lauder Cologne Ad - song placement "6 To Midnite" off Born Ugly LP (3/1)
-Detroit Music Awards for "Outstanding Heavy Rock Artist" for the Muggs & "Outstanding Rock
Instrumentalist - Dannymuggs" (5/4)
-Sixth tour of Spain from( 5/7 to 5/29)
Did you know? The Muggs are currently played on Spotify, Pandora & are on AMI/Rowe Internet
Jukeboxes all across the USA.

2017
-Michael Kors Father's Day Ad - song placement "6 To Midnite" off Born Ugly LP (6/12)
-Detroit Music Awards for "Outstanding Rock Recording" for the Muggs 4th full length album, Straight
Up Boogaloo & "Outstanding Rock Songwriter - Dannymuggs" (4/14)

2016
-Purge: Election Year - Movie - song placement "Never Know Why" off On With The Show LP (7/1)
-Direct TV's Rogue series - song placement "Leanin' Blues" off Bite Of The Weredog single & "Motown
Blues" off On With The Show LP (5/5)

2015
-Release of their 5th full length LP, (4th studio LP), Straight Up Boogaloo (3/21)
-5th EU Tour in support of Straight Up Boogaloo (5/5 thru 6/8)

2014
-Detroit Music Award for "Outstanding Pop/Rock Group" (4/25)
-ESPN's 30 for 30 documentary series - the Detroit Pistons Bad Boys Era - song placement "Motown
Blues" off On With The Show LP (4/17)
-VH1's That Metal Show- 2 song placements bumpers - "Get It On- episode 1309" - off On With The
Show LP & "Six To Midnite- episode 1311" - off Born Ugly LP (3/16 & 3/30)

2013
-WDIV Channel 4 - Vote 4 The Best -"Best Original Rock Band" in metro Detroit (12/15)
-4th EU Tour in support of their 4th full length release, Full Tilt:Live at Cadieux Cafe(5/8 thru 6/10)
Countries include: Spain, Germany, France, The Netherlands & Italy.
-Release of their 4th full length LP, Full Tilt: Live at Cadieux Cafe- a double live LP(4/26)
-Detroit Music Award for "Outstanding Rock/Pop Artist Group" (4/19)
-Detroit Music Award for "Outstanding Rock/Pop Instrumentalist- Tonymuggs" (4/19)
-Regional Chevy commercial. Chevy licensed "Notes From Underground" off Born Ugly(2011) in January.

2012
-3rd EU Tour in support of their 3rd full length release, Born Ugly (5/15 thru 6/18). Countries include:
Spain, Germany, France & The Netherlands.
Did you know? The Muggs are played on 100's of college & rock radio stations on the internet.

2011
-License several songs to "Jesse James Presents Austin Speed Shop- FENDERS" in December.
-License 3 songs to indie film doc, "The Waters Of Greenstone: A New Zealand Saga" in July.
-Release of their 3rd full length LP, Born Ugly (4/29)
-Detroit Music Award for "Outstanding Video/Independent Budget (Under $10,000)- Slow Curve" (4/15)
Did you know? The Muggs have opened for several national acts including: Mountain, Robin Trower,
Cactus, Savoy Brown, Thin Lizzy, Ten Years After, Glenn Hughes of Deep Purple/Black Sabbath, Gary
Hoey, Johnny Lang, Candlebox, Ian McLagan of Small Faces, North Mississippi Allstars, Warrant, The
Verve Pipe, Goober & The Peas, The Electric Six & The Detroit Cobras.

2010
-A&E's "Gene Simmon's Family Jewels" featured "All Around You", an original song off their 2nd full
length LP entitled On With The Show. (7/20)
-2nd EU Tour in support of their 2nd full length LP, On With The Show in April.
Did you know? The Muggs are a blues rock trio from Detroit, MI. Members include: Dannymuggs(lead
vox/guitar), Todd Glass(drums) & Tonymuggs(backing vox/Fender Rhodes bass).

2009
-License "Slow Curve" to indie film "Annabelle & Bear" in October.
-License "Should've Learned My Lesson" & "If You Please" off their 1st full length LP, The Muggs to indie
film "Stick It In Detroit" in October.
-Real Detroit Weekly Award "Best Indie Rock Band" in May.
-Detroit Music Award for "Outstanding Rock/Pop Recording- On With The Show" (4/17)
-USA Today's #5 Record Of The Year for 2008 "On With The Show" in January.
Did you know? The Muggs have been an independent band since 2006 & have independently funded On
With The Show(LP), Bite Of The Weredog(EP), Born Ugly(LP) & Full Tilt: Live At Cadieux Cafe(2x LP).

2008
-Music Connection "the 100 HOT Unsigned Bands" in December.
-Release of their EP, Bite Of The Weredog in October.
-Classic Rock Magazine review of "On With The Show" LP. 8 out of 10! August issue.
-Release of their 2nd full length LP, On With The Show (5/9)
-Detroit Music Award for "Outstanding Rock/Pop Artist/Group" in April.
-Detroit Music Awards for "Outstanding Rock/Pop Instrumentalist- Dannymuggs" in April.
-Dodge EU compilation "Out Of Detroit & Into Dodge", song "Need Ya Baby" off their 1st full length LP,
The Muggs. 100,000 promo copies! in February.
- Riff 2(local WRIF on line radio) Award for "Best Rock Band Of The Year 2007" in February.

2007
-FOX TV's American Idol Spin Off FLOP "The Next Great American Band" selected as 1 of 12 bands. Over
10,000+ bands applied. Auditions started in August. Show ran from October to December.
-License "Need Ya Baby" to "The Force Is Among Us"- Star Wars doc celebrating 30 years of fandom.
-1st EU Tour in support of their 1st full length LP, The Muggs in January.
-PBS special, "Rock n' Roll Safari" airing in Canada & all of Michigan. Live concert!

2006 & 2005
-Dodge Charger on line ad licensing 3 songs "Need Ya Baby", "Gonna Need My Help" & "Rollin' B-Side
Blues" off their 1st full length LP, The Muggs.
-Release their 1st full length LP, The Muggs with indie rock label Times Beach Records in Royal Oak,MI in
July.

2004
-The Muggs are signed by local metro Detroit label, Times Beach Records in August.

References 

http://www.themuggs.com/bio/ 
http://rockandrollreport.com/the-rock-and-roll-report-band-of-the-week-is-the-muggs/ 
http://www.sunsetislandmusic.com/?p=147

External links 
 Official Website
 Official Bandcamp
 Official Facebook
 Official Twitter

American blues rock musical groups
Musical groups from Detroit
2000 establishments in Michigan
Musical groups established in 2000